South Acworth is an unincorporated community in the town of Acworth in Sullivan County, New Hampshire, United States. New Hampshire Route 123A passes through the village, heading east to New Hampshire Route 10 in the town of Marlow and west to Alstead.

South Acworth has a separate ZIP code (03607) from the rest of Acworth.

References

Unincorporated communities in Sullivan County, New Hampshire
Unincorporated communities in New Hampshire